Bogucharsky Uyezd (Богучарский уезд) was one of the subdivisions of the Voronezh Governorate of the Russian Empire. It was situated in the southeastern part of the governorate. Its administrative centre was Boguchar.

Demographics
At the time of the Russian Empire Census of 1897, Bogucharsky Uyezd had a population of 309,965. Of these, 81.8% spoke Ukrainian, 17.8% Russian, 0.2% Belarusian and 0.1% Romani as their native language.

References

 
Uezds of Voronezh Governorate
Voronezh Governorate